Great Commission Churches (GCC) is a fellowship of independent evangelical Christian churches.  The Great Commission church movement began in the United States in 1970. Other associated organizations include Great Commission Ministries (GCM), Great Commission Latin America (GCLA), and Great Commission Europe (GCE). The movement has grown in size and scope through its focus on church planting in the United States and abroad. GCC is a member of the National Association of Evangelicals, and one or more organizations within the movement has continuously been a part of the Evangelical Council for Financial Accountability since 1992.

History
The Great Commission Association of Churches (GCAC) is the current name of an Evangelical Christian association of churches that started as a movement in 1965, though not generally recognized as a movement until 1970. The movement at first avoided any denominational affiliation, becoming known in the early 1970s as "The Blitz" or "The Blitz Movement," then as Great Commission International (GCI) when leaders formed a formal organization in 1983.  In 1989, GCI became GCAC ("Great Commission Association of Churches"), and Great Commission Ministries (GCM) was founded as the campus and international mission agency for GCAC; the campus ministry prior to this was known as Great Commission Students (GCS), although GCS did not employ full-time missionaries or do international work. Today, the "right hand of fellowship" ministry to international churches and ministries is known as the Great Commission Association (GCA). GCAC generally refers to itself as Great Commission Churches (GCC) in public communications.

Roots
In 1965, 20-year-old Jim McCotter (James Douglas McCotter) left his home in Colorado Springs, Colorado and moved to Greeley, Colorado in an attempt to recreate the New Testament Church, a church model he believed no existing Christian denomination was emulating fully.

McCotter, whose family's religious background was with the Plymouth Brethren, has stated that his desire to form the movement stemmed from his belief that God had shown him in the Bible's Book of Acts a strategy instructing Christians on how God wanted to use church planting to "reach the world for Christ" within one generation. This strategy came to be known as the "Heavenly Vision", and was a cornerstone belief of the early movement. McCotter also believed that the Bible was instructing every Christian to emulate the actions of the Apostle Paul's life as he imitated Christ and that this was the model life for all Christians to imitate based upon Paul's exhortation in 1 Corinthians 11:1.

Early members believed they were returning to the lost lifestyle of the first century Christians.

After arriving in Greeley, McCotter attended and began sharing his faith at the University of Northern Colorado campus. According to McCotter, by the end of the first year 12 people had joined him, after 1966 there were thirty, and in the following years it "doubled and tripled." The movement eventually spread to other cities in Colorado, as well as Las Cruces, New Mexico, in the form of missions or "works".

McCotter dropped out of college to focus on ministry full-time, and was planning to move down to Pueblo, Colorado to continue his efforts; however, in 1967, at the height of the Vietnam War, he was drafted into the United States Army. During basic training at Fort Polk, Louisiana, McCotter met Dennis Clark and on McCotter's return from Vietnam in 1970 he met Herschel Martindale. Clark and Martindale would become two of the founders of the movement in the summer of 1970.

"Blitz Movement" Begins
In 1970, under the leadership of Jim McCotter, Dennis Clark, Herschel Martindale, and others, approximately 30 college-age Christians embarked on a summer-long evangelical outreach known as "The Blitz" to several university campuses in the Southwestern United States.  These 2 or 3 day events used singing, tract distribution, and sidewalk canvassing to draw crowds and spread the word.  As the movement expanded, additional mission outreaches and training conferences took place. In the summer of 1973, nearly 1,000 people attended the movement's national conference. The conference was followed by the "blitzing" of fifteen new campuses and by the end of 1973, about 15 "works" had been established.  In the late 1970s, selected newspapers, former members, and select watchdog groups began to publicly criticize the movement's practices. This continued into the 1980s and early 1990s. (See the Criticism section for more information.)

Widmar v. Vincent
In 1981, a freedom of religion case was won by the student group of a church (Cornerstone) which was a part of the Great Commission Church movement. The University of Missouri at Kansas City did not allow its facilities to be used by college students for religious meetings. In an 8–1 ruling, the United States Supreme Court stated that the First Amendment Establishment Clause did not require the university to limit the use of its facilities by religious groups.

Great Commission International
In 1983, Great Commission International (GCI) was formed. Led by Jim McCotter and Dennis Clark, it was formed to provide services such as publishing and fund raising for the developing association.  That summer, GCI launched the first summer Leadership Training conference which attracted college students for a summer of intensive training in evangelism and discipleship. The LT program continues today under the leadership of Great Commission Ministries.

In 1985, GCI undertook a mass outreach and expansion effort called Invasion '85. During this effort, teams were sent to 50 college campuses with a goal of starting new campus ministries. While many "works" were successfully established during Invasion '85, most of them did not continue. According to GCAC, "team members were not properly trained nor were they given adequate support."

GCI continued to be scrutinized in some newspapers and by former members of the movement, and in 1985 several conferences were held with the purpose of helping former members of churches that were part of GCI "recover from the emotional and psychological damage they'd experienced" while in the movement. Shortly thereafter, Wellspring Retreat and Recovery Center, a cult and abusive religion recovery center, was formed by several ex-members of the movement.

In late 1986, founder Jim McCotter announced his resignation from GCI, stating a desire to utilize his entrepreneurial abilities in an attempt to influence secular media for Christ. Two years later, McCotter moved to Florida and has not since attended a church affiliated with the movement, with the exception of the 2003 Faithwalkers conference.

At this point in GCAC history, its churches claimed approximately 5,000 members.

GCAC and GCM formed
In 1989, Great Commission International changed its name to the Great Commission Association of Churches (GCAC), and is known today as Great Commission Churches (GCC).  Also in 1989, Great Commission Ministries (GCM), under the initial leadership of Dave Bovenmyer, was formed. Its aim was to "mobilize people into campus ministry by training them to raise financial support and by equipping them for campus ministry."

In 1996, the Internal Revenue Service selected GCM as a test case to eliminate the common practice known as "deputation," (which allows non-profit mission organizations to raise funds for its activities, while allowing contributors to claim income tax deduction).  The IRS reaffirmed GCM's non-profit status.

Today

Approximately 60 churches in the United States are affiliated with GCA, and approximately a dozen internationally in Europe, Asia and Latin America.  Together these churches claimed over 43,000 members in 2005.  According to a 2001 Ivy Jungle report as cited by John Schmalzbauer of Missouri State University, there were 6,900 college students involved in GCM.  GCA maintains an administrative support staff in Orlando, FL.

GCC publishes the periodical "Faithwalkers Journal" and other doctrinal papers,  written principally by pastors within the movement. Regional and national conferences are attended by both leaders and members of churches in the movement. Conferences include Faithwalkers, Ignite, High School Leadership Training (HSLT), and National Pastor's Conferences.

Partnerships
GCAC, and its associated bodies, is a member of several evangelical organizations including the National Association of Evangelicals, Evangelical Council for Financial Accountability, Evangelical Fellowship of Missions Agencies, and the Interdenominational Foreign Mission Association.  GCAC works with a number of organizations that share its aims including Samaritan's Purse, Global Pastors Network, Wycliffe Hall, Oxford, and Wycliffe Bible Translators.  GCM maintains a Council of Reference.  These members do not run or manage GCM, but affirm their support for the ministry and serve as a source of counsel for GCM leaders. Chi Alpha, the campus ministry of the Assemblies of God, has suggested parents check out GCM, among eight others, if there is no Chi Alpha on their students' campus and counts GCM among its founding ministries.

Affiliated organizations

Reliant (Formerly Great Commission Ministries)

Great Commission Ministries (GCM) was founded as the subsidiary campus and international mission agency for Great Commission Association of Churches, and began to serve other organizations without a mission agency of their own beginning in 2006.

In 2004, Boundless webzine (associated with Focus on the Family) published an article listing GCM as one of the "ten top college ministries across the U.S.", saying that their strategy of "seeking to incorporate students into the starting of a church based campus ministry" "has been effective to attract and involve thousands of students."  The article also stated that "Their outstanding Board of Directors and dedicated staff are committed to world missions and leadership development and thus supplying the church around the world with a fresh supply of equipped laborers."

Following the 2007 Virginia Tech massacre, GCM's Virginia Tech campus church New Life Christian Fellowship (NLCF) received widespread media coverage.  NLCF pastor Jim Pace, a GCM missionary, was a guest on Larry King Live and Good Morning America, CNN created a video of their memorial service.  Several newspapers, magazines, and radio shows carried quotes from NLCF pastors.

The largest financial supporters of Great Commission Ministries are individual donors.  In 2002, 92% of GCM's income came from contributions of this nature.  GCM missionaries are required to raise 100% of their support goal, which includes base salary, benefits, and ministry expenses.  Twelve percent of all funds raised goes toward administrative overhead. GCM has been a member of the ECFA since 1992. GCM now goes by the name Reliant.

Other affiliates

Great Commission Latin America (GCLA) is a Latin American outgrowth of Great Commission Ministries founded in 1974 by Daniel B. Sierra, a Cuban-American missionary from Florida Bible College and directed by Nelson Guerra since 1981, a native Honduran and former president of the Honduran National Association of Evangelicals. As of 2007 it consisted of 25 member churches.

Great Commission Churches (GCC) is a fellowship of churches in the Great Commission Association, which helps coordinate ministry activities in the U.S., including Great Commission Leadership Institute (GCLI), GCLI "Going Deeper" Regional conferences, Faithwalkers National Conferences, and national GCA Pastor's Conferences. GCM missionaries Steve and Danelle Nelson have written for Great Commission Churches' Faithwalkers Journal.

Great Commission Northwest (GCNW) is a regional association of North American GCA churches, spanning from Chicago to Seattle.

GCC has several regional subsidiaries as well, including GCC Regional Ministries (GCC-RM) and Great Commission Northlands (GCN) (which coordinates church planting, leadership training, and church coaching in Minnesota, North Dakota, and Wisconsin).

Past ministries and organizations
During the 1980s, a number of ministries and organizations were formed and then discontinued by the late 1980s in an attempt to "penetrate key centers of influence," including: Americans for Biblical Government, Great Commission Academy, Alpha Capital, THEOS (The Higher Education Opportunity Service), Communication Forum, and Students for Origins Research.  A campus ministry similar to the current Great Commission Ministries (GCM) existed prior to 1989 under the name of Great Commission Students (GCS).

Publications
Under the direction of Jim McCotter in the 1970s and 1980s, the movement started several magazines and newspapers, including The Cause, America Today, Today's Student, U.S. Press, Potential, and the Life Herald. These projects were short-lived or were discontinued in the late 1980s.

Several Relevant Magazine articles have also been written by GCM staff and members.

In February 2006, Exodus International published a Greg Van Nada article from the GCM Connect Newsletter in Exodus Impact.

Criticism

Criticism in Newspapers
In March 1978, the first public criticism of the movement and its practices was reported by the Iowa State Daily, after an Iowa State student who was later diagnosed as a manic-depressive spent 18 days in a psychiatric ward, followed by another 23-day stay in another, due to emotional problems his psychiatrist attributed to involvement with the movement's Iowa State campus ministry. Subsequent criticism of the movement appeared eight months later in a front-page article by the Des Moines Register, in which campus pastors expressed concerns over "manipulation" and "a kind of brainwashing." Throughout the late 1970s, 1980s, and early 1990s, similar criticisms were published by newspapers in Ohio, South Carolina, Maryland, New York, Illinois, Toronto, nationally across Canada, and in other locations, particularly those near college campuses where the movement was active. The movement was often accused of authoritarian practices, and some accounts quoted former members and cult researchers who accused the movement's leaders of "brainwashing" and "mind-control" techniques.

Criticism in Research Papers, Books, and Magazines
Two research papers critical of the movement were published between 1988 and 1995, as were three books that included the movement in its lists of "abusive Christian groups", one with a sequel which mentions dissatisfaction with the group's efforts. In a 1992 Group Magazine article by Ronald Enroth, one ex-member described the movement as fostering a "learned helplessness" in members.  In light of developments since 1994, Dr. Ronald Enroth no longer has concerns about Great Commission Churches.

Cult and "Aberrant" Labels 
In 1988, the movement was classified as a cult by the American Family Foundation (AFF), the (pre-Scientology) Cult Awareness Network, and the Council on Mind Abuse.  The Council on Mind Abuse ceased its existence in 1992, while the CAN was taken over by Scientologists in 1996 after years of legal issues. The movement was classified as an "aberrant Christian group" by Martin J. Butz in his 1991 research paper and by Paul Martin, a former leader of the movement, in 1993.

However, the charge Great Commission has at any time in its history been a "cult" has been dismissed by Great Commission Churches. In addition, William Watson, a writer of the book "A Concise Dictionary of Cults and Religions"  defended Great Commission. Watson wrote in a letter dated August 1, 1991, "I am convinced that the Great Commission Association of Churches, formerly GCI, is not, and has not been a cult.

In 2002, ex-member Larry Pile said he would not refer to the movement as a cult, but instead as a "Totalist Aberrant Christian Organization". Pile believed the movement was "Christian because they hold orthodox beliefs", and yet "aberrant on secondary issues." In a 2006 statement, Pile stated that many of the concerns expressed by him in the past over aberrant teaching is "old news" and "no longer characterizes GCAC/GCM, at least not systemically," while acknowledging that concerns, expressed to him from 2000 to 2006 by members and former members, reveal "residual problems at least in individual churches and leaders. Furthermore, many of the old problems have still not been addressed fully or forthrightly."

In December 2011, Larry Pile released a statement of reconciliation. Pile stated that "GCC has resolved to my satisfaction all issues of concern" and he requested that "the past remain the past." Pile went on to say "I urge that current members and leaders of GCC be evaluated fairly, according to how they teach and live out their faith in the present." Along with Pile's statement, GCC released an account of the reconciliation process on its website.

Maryland political controversy
In 1986, 12 members of a GCI church ran for state office in Maryland, prompting attention from the national media, and speculation from Maryland political leaders that it was a concerted effort by GCI to enter the political arena. None of the GCI church members running for office were thought to have had prior political aspirations, yet many filed papers to run on the same day, June 30. In a Washington Post article, GCI leaders denied formal involvement, stating that each person's decision to run was made independent of GCI leadership. On September 11, 1986, The Montgomery County Sentinel reported that none of the candidates won election.

University of Guelph Ban 
In 1989, the GC's campus ministry was banned from the University of Guelph, located in Ontario, Canada.

Responses to criticism

Tom Short, 'Setting Great Commission's record straight' 
On April 21, 1988, "The Diamondback" published an article by GCI's National Student Director, Tom Short, in which he defended the movement against an article written by Denny Gulick, professor of Mathematics at the University of Maryland, which charged that the movement was a "destructive cult." He also defended the movement against charges from the Cult Awareness Network that the movement was a cult, stating that CAN was the avowed enemy of anyone who claimed to have a life-changing experience and implying that Gulick had not looked into GCI with an open mind as had his mother.

1991 GCC Statement of Church Error
According to GCC, "During the late 1980s and early 1990s a concerted effort was made to reach out to people who felt that they had been hurt by GCI and its churches. At the initial urging of Tom Short, the GCI leaders and pastors published a paper as part of a plan to follow the Biblical standard of humility and reconciliation in relationships. This effort towards reconciliation, formally called Project CARE, was led by Dave Bovenmyer and was instrumental in building unity with Christians within and outside of Great Commission."

In 1991, GCAC released a public statement acknowledging church error and weakness.

In the statement, GCC clarified its position on many issues, and admitted responsibility for mistakes grouped into two categories; problems resulting from a "prideful attitude", and problems as "a result of a misapplication or misinterpretation of Scripture." Issues discussed in the statement include:
 Failing to distinguish between a command, and principle, and preference.
 Authoritarian and insensitive leadership.
 An "elitist attitude" towards other Christian organizations.
 Excessive and unbiblical church discipline.
 Improper response to criticism.
 Lack of emphasis on formal education.
 A belief that every man should become an elder.
 Treating dating as a sin.

The statement also listed steps taken, or to be taken, to correct these issues.

Response to statement
As of 1994, many former members felt the Weakness Statement was not enough or that it left out other concerns, according to Ronald Enroth's book Recovering From Churches that Abuse.  In light of developments since 1994, Dr. Ronald Enroth no longer has concerns about Great Commission Churches.  Dr. Paul Martin, director of Wellspring and a former member of GCI, is quoted extensively in the book and also notes his statements are now out of date.

2010 Explanation of Criticisms
In September 2010, John Hopler, Director of Great Commission Churches, posted an Explanation of Criticisms on the GCC website. This document serves to give insight into the continued criticisms of the movement, and specifically those against Jim McCotter. Hopler does not believe the criticisms stand up to examination.

List of campus ministries

Collegiate Church Network
Cornerstone Christian Fellowship (Illinois State University)
Illini Life (University of Illinois)
The Revolution (Ball State University)
Riverview Church (Michigan State University)
New Life Church (University of Michigan)
New Life Church (Eastern Michigan University)
New Life Church (Wayne State University)
The Rock (University of Missouri)
H2O Church - BGSU (Bowling Green State University)
H2O Church - Kent (Kent State University)
H2O Church - OSU (Ohio State University)
H2O Church - Cincinnati (University of Cincinnati)
H2O Church - Toledo (University of Toledo)
H2O Church - Pittsburgh (University of Pittsburgh)
Fellowship Church (Texas A&M University)
2.42 of San Marcos (Texas State University)
Hope Fellowship Church (University of North Texas)
Taproot Church (University of Texas San Antonio)
New Life Christian Fellowship (Virginia Tech)

Great Commission Churches
REACH, The Firehouse Church (Auraria Campus: University of Colorado Denver, Community College of Denver, Metropolitan State University)
The Rock Ft. Collins (Colorado State University)
The Rock (University of Northern Colorado)
Gator Christian Life (University of Florida)
Awaken Church and Jacksonville Christian Life (University of North Florida)
Seminole Christian Life (Florida State University)
The Rock @ COD, Glen Arbor Community Church (College of DuPage)
Campus Fellowship (Alive), Walnut Creek Community Church (Drake University)
The Rock, Stonebrook Community Church (Iowa State University)
Grace Campus Church (Purdue University)
The Rock (University of Minneapolis)
Grace at State, Grace Community Church (North Carolina State University)
H2O (University of North Dakota)
The Rock (University of Nebraska-Lincoln)
The Rock (University of Nebraska at Omaha)
Longhorn Life (University of Texas)
River City Network, Riverbend Community Church (University of South Carolina)
The Edge (University of Wisconsin-Eau Claire)
Emerge (West Virginia University)
South LA Christian Life (University of Southern California)

See also
Biblical inerrancy
Christian right
Intelligent design
Jesus movement
Jim McCotter
Larry Pile
Modern methods of evangelism
Paul R. Martin
Shepherding Movement
Tom Short
Wellspring Retreat and Resource Center

Notes

References

External links
Great Commission Churches' official website
Great Commission Association's official website
Great Commission Ministries' official website
Great Commission Latin America's English website
Great Commission Latin America's official website, in Spanish
Leadership Training Program homepage
GCM Dad Support Group and Monthly Email
Daylights Online
1991 Statement of Church Error
Marching To Zion: A Personal History and Analysis of the “Blitz Movement” aka Great Commission Association of Churches By Lawrence A. Pile

 
Evangelicalism in North America
Christian movements
Evangelical parachurch organizations
Christian organizations established in 1970
Evangelical denominations in North America
Student religious organizations in the United States
Members of the National Association of Evangelicals